George Chatterton (23 September 1821 – 1881) was an English first-class cricketer, active 1849–61, who played for Sheffield Cricket Club (aka Yorkshire) and Marylebone Cricket Club (MCC). A right-handed batsman and occasional right-arm slow underarm bowler, he scored 1,611 first-class runs with a highest score of 109, his only century, and took 25 wickets at 13.45, with his best return of 7 for 21 against Kent.

References

1821 births
1881 deaths
Cricketers from Sheffield
Players cricketers
English cricketers
Sheffield Cricket Club cricketers
Marylebone Cricket Club cricketers
North v South cricketers
Marylebone Cricket Club and Metropolitan Clubs cricketers
English cricketers of 1826 to 1863
All-England Eleven cricketers